Floodgate Records was a part of the East West Records family of labels. It was founded in 2000 and managed by Tim Taber (formerly of The Prayer Chain). Distribution was through Word Records and marketing through Rocketown. Their first release was All I Have, a worship album by Rita Springer. The label ceased operations at an unknown point before mid-2008.

Artists 
 Bernard
 Brian & Jenn Johnson
 Cool Hand Luke
 Denison Marrs
 East West
 Forever Changed
 Hundred Year Storm
 The Insyderz
 Life in Your Way
 Kate Miner
 Mourning September
 The Myriad
 Number One Gun
 Rita Springer
 Transition (not to be confused with a UK indie band of the same name)
 Yellow Second

See also 
 List of Christian record labels

References

External links 
 

Defunct record labels of the United States
Record labels established in 2000
Christian record labels